Kasha Paris is a French company focusing on the restoration of historic apartments and luxury real estate sales in the Saint-Germain-des-Prés area of Paris. The company is known for restoring the architectural details of apartments built in the 17th and 18th century and updating them for modern living. Architectural details are refurbished by craftsmen using techniques similar to those originally used in classical Parisian apartments.

Unlike most property developers, the company's Left Bank properties are purchased, designed, restored, and furnished before being offered for sale as turnkey properties, in order to maintain the integrity of the original architecture without influence from potential buyers.  The apartments are designed by the company owners, Alon and Betsy Kasha. Ms. Kasha is a former marketing executive at Cartier, and Mr. Kasha is a former banking executive. Both have studied Parisian architecture extensively.

Kasha Paris designed apartments, typically ranging from 700 to 2,000 square feet (65 to 185 square meters), are sold for $800,000 to more than $2 million, a premium of 15-20% above market values. The company's renovation process focuses on the original built structure of the apartment while adding modern features and amenities. The company views its products less as real estate, and more as luxury fashion.

Because of its prices and positioning, the company has been a subject of controversy. Detractors contend that A+B Kasha drives up Left Bank real estate prices. The company responds by saying that its higher prices are necessary to provide the public service of faithfully restoring historic apartments.

At any given time Kasha Paris has up to ten properties in various phases, from purchase offers to renovation to contract.

References and footnotes

External links
Official Website
Fire Restoration

Interior design firms
Interior design
6th arrondissement of Paris
French companies established in 2004
Design companies established in 2004
Real estate companies established in 2004
Real estate companies of France